Lee Ji-hoon (born October 29, 1988) is a South Korean actor. He made his acting debut in the teen series School 2013, and has played supporting roles in family dramas You're the Best! and Golden Rainbow.

Filmography

Film

Television series

Variety show

Theater

Awards and nominations

References

External links 
 Lee Ji-hoon at KeyEast 

1988 births
Living people
People from Namyangju
South Korean male television actors
South Korean male film actors
South Korean male web series actors
21st-century South Korean male actors